Sohni Mahiwal or Suhni Mehar  ( is one of the four popular tragic romances of Punjab including Sindh. In Sindh Sohni's shrine is in Shahdadpur Town of Sangar District. The others are Sassi Punnun, Mirza Sahiba, and Heer Ranjha. Sohni Mahiwal is a tragic love story which inverts the classical motif of Hero and Leander. The heroine Sohni, unhappily married to a man she despises, swims every night across the river using an earthenware pot to keep afloat in the water, to where her beloved Mehar herds buffaloes. One night her sister-in-law replaces the earthenware pot with a vessel of unbaked clay, which dissolves in water and she dies in the whirling waves of the river.

The story also appears in Shah Jo Risalo and is one of seven popular tragic romances from Sindh. The other six tales are Umar Marui,  Sassui Punhun, Lilan Chanesar, Noori Jam Tamachi, Sorath Rai Diyach  and Momal Rano  commonly known as Seven Heroines of Shah Abdul Latif Bhittai. Shah begins the story at the most dramatic moment, when a young woman cries out for help in the cold river, attacked by crocodiles. The whole chapter (Sur Sohni) is merely an extension of this dreadful and yet hoped-for moment when the vessel of her body breaks and she, faithful to her pre-eternal love-covenant with Mehar, will be forever united through death.

Sohni is one of the favourite folktales both in Sindh and Punjab.

Story

In the 18th century (late Mughal period), the beautiful girl Sohni was born to a potter named Tulla (Toolha).  They were from the Kumhar caste, and lived in Gujrat, Punjab. At the time, Gujrat, on the river Chenab, was a caravanserai on the trade route between Bukhara and Delhi.

As Sohni grew up, she helped her father decorate his pots. Their shop is said to have been near Rampyari Mahal by the river. As soon as the Surahis (water-pitchers) and mugs came off the wheel, she would draw artistic designs on them and set them up for sale.

Izzat Baig of Bukhara
Shahzada Izzat Baig, a rich trader from Bukhara (Uzbekistan), came to Punjab on business and halted in Gujrat. Here he saw Sohni at the shop and was completely smitten.  Just to get a glimpse of Sohni, he would end up buying the water pitchers and mugs every day.

Sohni too lost her heart to Izzat Baig. Instead of returning to Bukhara with his caravan, the noble-born Izzat Baig took up the job of a servant in the house of Tulla. He would even take their buffaloes for grazing. Soon, he came to be known as Mehar or "Mahiwal" (buffalo herder).

Sohni's marriage
The love of Sohni and Mahiwal caused a commotion within the Kumhar community. It was not acceptable that a daughter from this community would marry an outsider, so her parents immediately arranged her marriage with another potter. On the day the "barat" (marriage party) of that potter arrived at her house, Sohni felt helpless and lost. She was sent off to the husband's house in a Doli (palanquin).

Izzat Baig renounced the world and started living as a faqir (hermit). He eventually moved to a small hut across the river Chenab from Sohni's new home hamirpur. 
In the dark of night, when the world was fast asleep, the lovers would meet by the river. Izzat would come to the riverside and Sohni would come to meet him swimming with the help of an inverted hard baked pitcher (inverted so that it would not sink). He would regularly catch a fish and bring it for her. It is said that once, when due to high tide he could not catch a fish, Mahiwal cut a piece of his thigh and roasted it. Sohni didn't realise this at first but then she told Izzat that this fish tastes different. When she kept her hand on his leg, she realised what Mahiwal had done and this only strengthened their love for each other.

Tragic end

Meanwhile, rumours of their romantic rendezvous spread. One day Sohni’s sister-in-law followed her and saw the hiding place where Sohni kept her earthenware pitcher. She informed her mother, Sohni's mother-in-law, and instead of telling Sohni's husband (who was away on a business trip), the women decided to take the decision in their own hands and finish the matter. The next day, the sister-in-law removed the hard baked pitcher and replaced it with an unbaked one. That night, when Sohni tried to cross the river with the help of the pitcher, it dissolved in the water and Sohni drowned. From the other side of the river, Mahiwal saw Sohni drowning and jumped into the river to save her and drowned as well. Thus, the lovers were reunited in death.

Sindhi version of Sohni-Mehar
A somewhat different version of the story is told in Sindh, where Sohni is believed to be a girl of Jat tribe living on the western bank of the Indus River; and Dam, Sohni's husband, was of the Samtia, living on the eastern bank. In actual version of Sindhi lovetale of Sohni Mehar, Sohni was believed to be daughter of Kumhar tribe, a Potter. The love between Sohni and Mehar is attributed to a drink of milk that Mehar gave her during the marriage procession over the river.

Tomb of Sohni And Mahiwal

Legend has  from Hyderabad, Pakistan. Sohni's tomb is located at nawabshah Road, Shahdadpur, and is visited by lovers.

Popular culture
The story of Sohni and Mahiwal was popularized in the Punjabi qissa (long poem) Sohni Mahiwal by Fazal Shah Sayyad, who also wrote poems on Heer Ranjha, Laila Majnu and others.

The Sohni Mahiwal love story continues to inspire numerous modern songs, including Pathanay Khan's famous song Sohni Gharay nu akhadi aj mainu yaar milaa ghadeya. Alam Lohar has also made many renditions of this kalaam and was one of the first singers to present the story in a song format. Pakistani pop band Noori's song Dobara Phir Se is inspired by the lore of this story as well as the more recent, Paar channa de, from Coke Studio Pakistan (season 9). Paar channa de was earlier sung by Arif Lohar and Saleema Jawwad for 2013 movie Zinda Bhaag, based on a traditional folk song.

Many paintings of Sohni Mahiwal continue to be created by well-known artists such as Sobha Singh. Folk versions of these paintings, for example in the Kangra style, are commonly found across the whole Punjab region.

Four Hindi film versions, named Sohni Mahiwal have been made in India:
 1933 by Harshadrai Sakerlal Mehta; starring Gauhar Karnataki, Master Chonkar, Shivrani and Master Kanti.
 1946 directed by Ishwarlal and Ravindra Jaykar; starring Ishwarlal and Begum Para.
 1958 by Raja Nawathe; starring Bharat Bhushan and Nimmi.
 1984 directed by Kanwal Biala, Latif Faiziyev and Umesh Mehra; starring Sunny Deol and Poonam Dhillon.
Other Indian films including silent ones based on the romance are:

 Sohni Mahiwal (1928) by K.P. Bhave, starring Gauhar Karnataki and Jamshedji.
 Sohni Mahiwal (1928) by Anand Prasad Kapoor, starring Himat, Miss Mani, Master Vithal and Zebunissa.
 Sohni Mahiwal (1939) by Roshan Lal Shorey.
 Sohni Mahiwaal (1984) by Kanwal Biala, starring Daljit Kaur, Arun Chopra, Mehar Mittal and Kanchan Mattu.

See also

 Heer Ranjha
Tomb paintings of Sindh
Sri Charitropakhyan

References

External links
 Suhini- Mehar(Sohini-Mahival )
 Suhni Mehar in Sindhi
 Sur Suhni in Shah Jo Risalo
 Sohni & Mehar - The Poetry of Shah (Translated by Elsa Kazi)

Love stories
Fictional duos
Punjabi folklore
Sindhi folklore
Shah Jo Risalo
Indian folklore
Indian literature
Pakistani folklore
Pakistani literature
Jat